The Municipality of Makole is a municipality in the traditional region of Styria in northeastern Slovenia. The seat of the municipality is the town of Makole. Makole became a municipality in 2006.

In October 2006 Alojz Gorčenko was elected mayor.

Geography

The municipality of Makole has just under 40 percent of the working population. It is located in the Dravinja Valley on the western edge of Haloze at the end of Jelovec Creek. The municipality is on the border between the Drava Valley and Celje region. It also borders the municipalities of Rogaška Slatina and Majšperk.

Tourism

Today, Makole is a municipality with tourist attractions and with opportunities for development and a rich cultural and natural heritage, including Štatenberg mansion, numerous springs, karst caves, and vineyards. Tourism is developing and growing in the municipality. Recently, recreational activity has flourished. There are also hunting and fishing tourism, horseback riding, and many complementary activities on farms.

Settlements
In addition to the municipal seat of Makole, the municipality also includes the following settlements:

 Dežno pri Makolah
 Jelovec pri Makolah
 Ložnica
 Mostečno
 Pečke
 Savinsko
 Stari Grad
 Štatenberg
 Stopno
 Stranske Makole
 Strug
 Varoš

References

External links

Municipality of Makole on Geopedia
Municipality of Makole website

Makole
2006 establishments in Slovenia